Bzou (بزو) is a town  in the northwest corner of Morocco’s Azilal Province, just off the main road between the major cities of Beni-Mellal and Marrakesh. The sprawling commune of Bzou is composed of various Berber (a mix of Tashelhit and Tamazight) and Arabic-speaking douwars (hamlets) tucked into the foothills of the High Atlas Mountains. The main, Arabic speaking cluster of douwars (Lamdarssa, Douwar Shms, Foum Sheaba) forms Bzou's heart; on its flanks are an assortment of smaller, generally Berber douwars up in the surrounding mountains and cradling the banks of the river Oued el Abid.

With a population of approximately 4200 people in its center and 14,505 in the commune as a whole, Bzou is regionally and nationally famous for its production of the highest quality fabric used in the tailoring of a specific piece of traditional Moroccan clothing known as Djellaba. Additionally, Bzou produces a considerable amount of olives, olive oil, and honey. Economically speaking, Bzou is heavily dependent on this basic agriculture and the extremely labor-intensive, handmade fabric for which it is famous.

Short history 

According to a plethora of local sources, Bzou's original core and souk (marketplace) were in the Amazigh douwar of Tagounte. Cresting a modest hill overlooking the Oued al Abid River on one side and a valley of caves on the other, Tagounte was the center of business and social activity for much of Bzou's history despite its moderate size. Relatively recently (mid 1900s), the economy of the douwar, and in many ways Bzou, was driven by the presence of various merchant Jewish families who bought and sold an assortment of products, providing the area with much needed commerce. Today only one member remains, living in Foum Teghia and still dealing with commerce. Bzou is historically referenced in Jewish tradition as a poor place with limited resources, as told by Rabbi Simon Serfaty "בז׳ו בזויה מכל הארצות - קוסקוס בבוקר, קוסקוס בערב, עד ששכחתי ברכת המזון" - meaning "In Bzou, Eating Couscous morning and evening, so much that I've forgotten Birkat Hamazon".

Eventually, the limited accessibility and physical growth potential of Tagounte shifted the center over to the sprawling cluster of douwars where it currently resides. This current day center hosts two small souikas per week (the large, traditional souk is down the road in BaHi) and is located on the main paved road, which is under expansion.

Leo Africanus

Describing Bzou in his 16th-century work A Geographical Historie of Africa, Moroccan author, traveler and diplomat Leo Africanus (al-Hasan ibn Muhammad al-Wazzan al-Fasi) wrote:

Attractions 

On the way to the famous waterfalls at Ouzoud, Bzou is a great place to spend a day or two on an environmental tour of Morocco. There are various day hikes to the smaller mountain douwars and to the riverside hills which overlook the valley. In the summer, Bzou's main attraction, "Temda", blossoms into a must-see hangout spot for locals and tourists. A small natural pond fed by runoff from the river Oued el Abid, Temda is flanked by cafés, trees and flowers up and around the rock face which surround it. Since summer heat fades only in the evening and the light lingers relatively late, this cool shady retreat remains a local hot spot into the night.

Another regional summer attraction is the town's annual festival in July–August. The festival, or moussem, features traditional music, theater and fantasia as well as a wide display of local artisans' products. Numerous local painters, potters and craftsmen put their stock up for sale, but the marquee item is sure to be Bzou's own high quality djellaba material, made entirely by hand with traditional methods, exclusively in this region.

Fantasia 

Fantasia is a traditional equestrian performance practiced during cultural festivals throughout Morocco. It consists of a group of horse riders, wearing traditional clothes and charging along a straight path at the same speed so as to form a line. At the end of the ride (about two hundred meters) all riders fire in the sky using old gunpowder guns. The difficulty of the performance is synchronization during the acceleration and especially during firing so that one single shot is heard.

Etymology 

One of the prevalent theories concerning the name of the town is that it was derived from the Berber root word "lbz" which refers to the process of spinning silk thread. This theory thus connects Bzou's history as a town of weavers to the origin of its name.

List of douwars within the commune 
Lamdarssa
Douwar Shms
Foum Teghia
Foum Sheaba
BaHi
Akkermoud
Ait BaHou
Ait Wagin
Ait Rabat
Mazouz
Ait Atmouli
Iferghess
Tamkdite
Bal
Aghbalou
Achbarou
Laataf
Taashou
Tagount
Ikayen
Tin Firt
Argue
Zalguen
Oued el Abid
Moughyaye
Lekesser
Nzala
Ait Ali Oulhaj
Lhafra
Sheaba Hamra
Tarkoukou
Zangar
Tinoualine
Ouaourint

References 

Populated places in Azilal Province
Rural communes of Béni Mellal-Khénifra